Solid fats and added sugars (SoFAS) is a dietary education program of the USDA regarding overconsumption of saturated fats, transfats (which are both solid at room temperature) and artificially added sugars especially in highly processed foods.

References 

Lipids
Nutrition
United States Department of Agriculture